Flathead galaxias is a common name for several fish and may refer to:

Galaxias depressiceps, native to New Zealand
Galaxias rostratus, native to Australia